The 2018 LEN Women's Europa Cup is the inaugural tournament of the LEN Europa Cup.

Preliminary round

Group A
February 1–4, 2018, Oosterhout, Netherlands

Group B
February 1–4, 2018, Volos, Greece

Super Final
March 22–24, 2018, Pontevedra, Spain

Qualified teams

Bracket

Quarterfinals
All times are CET (UTC+1).

Semifinals
All times are CET (UTC+1).

5th place match
All times are CET (UTC+1).

Bronze medal match
All times are CET (UTC+1).

Gold medal match
All times are CET (UTC+1).

Final ranking

External links
2018 LEN Women's Europa Cup (official website)

LEN Europa Cup
2018 in water polo